They Were Five (French: La belle équipe) is a 1936 French drama film directed by Julien Duvivier and starring Jean Gabin, Charles Vanel, and Viviane Romance. It tells the story of five unemployed workers who win the jackpot in the national lottery but their solidarity then proves fragile.

Plot
Five unemployed men in Paris are friends. Jeannot, Jacques, and Tintin are bachelors. Charlot (though the rest do not know) has left his faithless wife Gina, while Mario is an illegal immigrant from Spain who has got engaged to Huguette. Suddenly their lives are transformed when their syndicate wins the jackpot in the national lottery.

After much discussion, which Jeannot tends to lead, they agree to pool the money. Rowing up the river Marne, they see a ruined laundry and agree to convert it themselves into a guinguette, a riverside restaurant and dance hall. Living on site and working all day, there is much bonding between the five but fissures also appear.

Tintin plays the fool while on the roof and falls fatally. Jacques disappears with his share of the money. Mario gets notice of expulsion and hastily marries Huguette before complying. This leaves Jeannot and Charlot, who proceed to fall out over Gina, still legally married to Charlot, who not only wants to get her hands on Charlot's share of the winnings but easily seduces the willing Jeannot.

In the original pessimistic ending, Jeannot's jealousy leads him to shoot Charlot dead, while in the re-shot optimistic ending the two men unite as friends against the woman's wiles.

Selected cast 
 Jean Gabin as Jeannot
 Charles Vanel as Charlot 
 Raymond Aimos as Tintin
 Charles Dorat as Jacques
 Raphaël Médina as Mario
 Micheline Cheirel as Huguette, Mario's fiancée
 Viviane Romance as Gina, the wife of Charles
 Marcelle Géniat as Huguette's grandmother
 Fernand Charpin as policeman Antomarchi
 Raymond Cordy as the drunkard

Production
The script was written by Duvivier and Charles Spaak, with Maurice Yvain provided the score. Jean Gabin's song Quand on s'promène au bord de l'eau was written by Duvivier, Yvain and Louis Poterat. Interiors were shot at the Joinville Studios in Joinville-le-Pont, Val-de-Marne, with exteriors at Chennevières-sur-Marne. The film's sets were designed by the art director Jacques Krauss.

Critical reception
Critics have associated the film with the rise and demise of the Popular Front. The film was made in June and July 1936 and coincided with the early days of the Léon Blum government and the strikes for better conditions. Duvivier was certainly not a Leftist.  It should be pointed out nonetheless that Duvivier's portrayal of male friendship gradually being eroded by a woman and by desire for that woman was canonical by 1936, so the film does not limit itself to that reading. If the men in Duvivier's film do not get to fulfil their dream of setting up their guinguette it is because, while economically they can be solidaires—as one,  sexually they cannot. On a first level of reading, therefore, it is sex before politics that drives the narrative."

References

External links
 

Films directed by Julien Duvivier
1936 films
Films scored by Maurice Yvain
1936 drama films
French drama films
1930s French-language films
Films shot at Joinville Studios
French black-and-white films
1930s French films